The women's trap shooting event at the 2015 Pan American Games was held on July 13 at Pan Am Shooting Centre in Innisfil. The event consisted of three rounds: a qualifier, a semifinal and a medal round. In the qualifier, each shooter fired 3 sets of 25 targets in trap shooting, with 10 targets being thrown to the left, 10 to the right, and 5 straight-away in each set. The shooters could take two shots at each target. The top 6 shooters in the qualifying round moved on to the semifinal, where fired one additional round of 15 targets and only one shot could be taken at each target. The top 2 qualified to dispute the gold medal and the third and fourth qualified to disputed the bronze medal. Ties are broken using a shoot-off; additional shots are fired one at a time until there is no longer a tie.

The winners of all fifteen events, along with the runner up in the men's air rifle, skeet, trap and both women's rifle events will qualify for the 2016 Summer Olympics in Rio de Janeiro, Brazil (granted the athlete has not yet earned a quota for their country).

Schedule
All times are Eastern Daylight Time (UTC-4).

Records
The existing world and Pan American Games records were as follows.

Results

Qualification round

Semifinal

Finals

Bronze-medal match

Gold-medal match

References

Shooting at the 2015 Pan American Games
Pan